EcoHealth Alliance is a US-based non-governmental organization with a stated mission of protecting  people, animals, and the environment from emerging infectious diseases. The nonprofit is focused on research that aims to prevent pandemics and promote conservation in hotspot regions worldwide.

The EcoHealth Alliance focuses on diseases caused by deforestation and increased interaction between humans and wildlife. The organization has researched the emergence of diseases such as severe acute respiratory syndrome (SARS), Nipah virus, Middle East respiratory syndrome (MERS), Rift Valley fever, the Ebola virus, and COVID-19.

EcoHealth Alliance also advises the World Organization for Animal Health (OIE), the International Union for Conservation of Nature (IUCN), the United Nations Food and Agriculture Organization (FAO), and the World Health Organization (WHO) on global wildlife trade, threats of disease and the environmental damage posed by these. 

Following the outbreak of the COVID-19 pandemic, EcoHealth's ties with the Wuhan Institute of Virology were put into question in relation to investigations into the origin of COVID-19. Citing these concerns, the National Institutes of Health (NIH) withdrew funding to the organization in April 2020. Significant criticism followed this decision, including a joint letter signed by 77 Nobel laureates and 31 scientific societies. The NIH later reinstated funding to the organization as one of 11 institutions partnering in the Centers for Research in Emerging Infectious Diseases or CREID initiative in August of 2020, but all activities funded by the grant remain suspended.

In 2022, the NIH terminated EcoHealth Alliance grant, stating that "EcoHealth Alliance had not been able to hand over lab notebooks and other records from its Wuhan partner that relate to controversial experiments involving modified bat viruses, despite multiple requests." In 2023, an audit by the Office of Inspector General of the Department of Health and Human Services found that "NIH did not effectively monitor or take timely action to address" compliance problems with the EcoHealth Alliance.

History 
Founded under the name Wildlife Preservation Trust International in 1971 by British naturalist, author, and television personality, Gerald Durrell, it then became The Wildlife Trust in 1999. In the fall of 2010, the organization changed its name to EcoHealth Alliance. The rebrand reflected a change in the organization's focus, moving solely from a conservation nonprofit, which focused mainly on the captive breeding of endangered species, to an environmental health organization with its foundation in conservation.

The organization held an early professional conservation medicine meeting in 1996. In 2002, they published an edited volume on the field through Oxford University Press: Conservation Medicine: Ecological Health in Practice.

In February 2008, they published a paper in Nature entitled “Global trends in emerging infectious diseases” which featured an early rendition of a global disease hotspot map. Using epidemiological, social, and environmental data from the past 50 years, the map outlined regions of the globe most at risk for emergent disease threats.

EcoHealth Alliance's funding comes mostly from U.S. federal agencies such as the Department of Defense, Department of Homeland Security, and U.S. Agency for International Development. Between 2011 and 2020, its annual budget has fluctuated between US$9 and US$15 million per year.

COVID-19 pandemic 

Following the outbreak of the COVID-19 pandemic, EcoHealth Alliance has been the subject of controversy and increased scrutiny due to its ties to the Wuhan Institute of Virology (WIV)—which has been at the center of speculation since early 2020 that SARS-CoV-2 may have escaped in a lab incident. Prior to the pandemic, EcoHealth Alliance was the only U.S.-based organization researching coronavirus evolution and transmission in China, where they partnered with the WIV, among others. EcoHealth president Peter Daszak co-authored a February 2020 letter in The Lancet condemning "conspiracy theories suggesting that COVID-19 does not have a natural origin". However, Daszak failed to disclose EcoHealth's ties to the WIV, which some observers noted as an apparent conflict of interest. In June 2021, The Lancet published an addendum in which Daszak disclosed his cooperation with researchers in China.

In April 2020, the NIH ordered EcoHealth Alliance to cease spending the remaining $369,819 from its current NIH grant at the request of the Trump administration, pressuring them by stating "it must hand over information and materials from Chinese research facility to resume funding for suspended grant" in reference to the Wuhan Institute of Virology. The cancelled grant was supposed to run through 2024. Funding from NIH resumed in August 2020 after uproar from "77 U.S. Nobel laureates and 31 scientific societies".

Work conducted at the Wuhan Institute of Virology under an NIH grant to the EHA has been at the center of political controversies during the pandemic. One such controversy centered on whether any experiments conducted under the grant could be accurately described as "gain-of-function" (GoF) research. NIH officials (including Anthony Fauci) unequivocally denied during 2020 congressional hearings that the EHA had conducted GoF research with NIH funding.

In October 2021, the EHA submitted a progress report detailing the results of a past experiment where some laboratory mice lost more weight than expected after being infected with a modified bat coronavirus. The NIH subsequently sent a letter to the congressional committee on energy and commerce describing this experiment, but did not refer to it as "gain-of-function". Whether such research qualifies as "gain-of-function" is a matter of considerable debate among relevant experts.

Programs

PREDICT
EcoHealth Alliance partners with USAID on the PREDICT subset of USAID's EPT (Emerging Pandemic Threats) program. PREDICT seeks to identify which emerging infectious diseases are of the greatest risk to human health. Many of EcoHealth Alliance's international collaborations with in-country organizations and institutions fall under the PREDICT umbrella. Scientists in the field collect samples from local fauna in order to track the spread of potential harmful pathogens and to stop them from becoming outbreaks. Scientists also train local technicians and veterinarians in animal sampling and information gathering.

Active Countries: Bangladesh, Cameroon, China, Democratic Republic of the Congo, Egypt, Ethiopia, Guinea, India, Indonesia, Jordan, Kenya, Liberia, Malaysia, Myanmar, Nepal, Sierra Leone, Sudan, South Sudan, Thailand, Uganda, Vietnam.

IDEEAL
IDEEAL (Infectious Disease Emergence and Economics of Altered Landscapes Program) seeks to study the impact deforestation and land-use change have in Sabah, Malaysia in regards to increased risk of zoonoses. This work is centered in particular around the local palm oil industry.  The project also suggests sustainable alternatives to large-scale deforestation to the country's business leaders and its policy-makers. The program is based at the Development Health Research Unit (DHRU) in Malaysia, cofounded with the Malaysian University of Sabah.

Rift Valley Fever Virus
Rift Valley fever (RVFV) has wreaked havoc on the livestock industry in sub-Saharan Africa where it is most prominent. EcoHealth Alliance is working in South Africa to better predict outbreaks by studying the impact of environment and human behavior in regards to the mosquito-spread virus. EcoHealth Alliance is also already at work with policymakers on a plan should RVFV spread to the United States.

Bat Conservation
A growing body of research indicates that bats are an important factor in both ecosystem health, and disease emergence. A number of hypotheses have been proposed for the high number of zoonoses that have come from bat populations in recent decades. One group of researchers hypothesized “that flight, a factor common to all bats but to no other mammals, provides an intensive selective force for coexistence with viral parasites through a daily cycle that elevates metabolism and body temperature analogous to the febrile response in other mammals. On an evolutionary scale, this host-virus interaction might have resulted in the large diversity of zoonotic viruses in bats, possibly through bat viruses adapting to be more tolerant of the fever response and less virulent to their natural hosts.”

Project Deep Forest
According to the FAO (Food and Agriculture Organization), roughly 18 million acres of forest (roughly the size of Panama) are lost every year due to deforestation. Increased contact between humans and the animal species whose habitat is being destroyed has led to increases in zoonotic disease. EcoHealth Alliance scientists are testing species for pathogens in areas with very little, moderate, and complete deforestation in order to track potential outbreaks. This data is used to promote the preservation of natural lands and diminish the negative effects of land-use change.

Project DEFUSE
Project DEFUSE was a rejected DARPA grant application, which proposed to sample bat coronaviruses from various locations in China. To evaluate whether bat coronaviruses might spillover into the human population, the grantees proposed to create chimeric coronaviruses which were mutated in different locations, before evaluating their ability to infect human cells in the laboratory. One proposed alteration was to modify bat coronaviruses to insert a cleavage site for the Furin protease at the S1/S2 junction of the spike (S) viral protein. Another part of the grant aimed to create noninfectious protein-based vaccines containing just the spike protein of dangerous coronaviruses. These vaccines would then be administered to bats in caves in southern China to help prevent future outbreaks. Co-investigators on the rejected proposal included Ralph Baric from UNC, Linfa Wang from Duke–NUS Medical School in Singapore, and Shi Zhengli from the Wuhan Institute of Virology.

See also
Durrell Wildlife Conservation Trust
Wildlife Preservation Canada

References

External links

Durrell Wildlife Conservation Trust
Wildlife Preservation Canada

Environmental organizations based in the United States
Environmental microbiology